The 2003 Bass Pro Shops MBNA 500 was the fourth stock car race of the 2003 NASCAR Winston Cup Series season and the 45th iteration of the event. The race was held on Sunday, March 9, 2003, in Hampton, Georgia at Atlanta Motor Speedway, a  permanent asphalt quad-oval intermediate speedway. The race took the scheduled 325 laps to complete. Joe Gibbs Racing driver Bobby Labonte would make a late charge against Hendrick Motorsports driver Jeff Gordon near the end of the race, passing him with nine laps to go to win his 20th career NASCAR Winston Cup Series win and his first of the season. To fill out the podium, Dale Earnhardt Jr. of Dale Earnhardt, Inc. would finish third.

Background 

Atlanta Motor Speedway (formerly Atlanta International Raceway) is a track in Hampton, Georgia, 20 miles (32 km) south of Atlanta. It is a 1.54-mile (2.48 km) quad-oval track with a seating capacity of 111,000. It opened in 1960 as a 1.5-mile (2.4 km) standard oval. In 1994, 46 condominiums were built over the northeastern side of the track. In 1997, to standardize the track with Speedway Motorsports' other two 1.5-mile (2.4 km) ovals, the entire track was almost completely rebuilt. The frontstretch and backstretch were swapped, and the configuration of the track was changed from oval to quad-oval. The project made the track one of the fastest on the NASCAR circuit.

Entry list

Practice 
Originally, three practice sessions were going to be held, with one on Friday and two on Saturday. However, fog on Saturday would force NASCAR to combine the two practices on Saturday into one session.

First practice 
The first practice session was held on Friday, March 7, at 11:20 AM EST, and would last for 2 hours.

Second and final practice 
The second and final practice session, sometimes referred to as Happy Hour, was held on Saturday, March 8, at 10:15 AM EST, and would last for one hour and 45 minutes.

Qualifying 
Qualifying was held on Friday, March 7, at 3:05 PM EST. Positions 1-36 would be decided on time, while positions 37-43 would be based on provisionals. Six spots are awarded by the use of provisionals based on owner's points. The seventh is awarded to a past champion who has not otherwise qualified for the race. If no past champ needs the provisional, the next team in the owner points will be awarded a provisional.

Two drivers would fail to qualify: Bobby Hamilton Jr. and Jeff Fultz.

Full qualifying results

Race results

References 

2003 NASCAR Winston Cup Series
NASCAR races at Atlanta Motor Speedway
March 2003 sports events in the United States
2003 in sports in Georgia (U.S. state)